The 1995 Mid-Eastern Athletic Conference men's basketball tournament took place February 28–March 3, 1995, at the Talmadge L. Hill Field House in Baltimore, Maryland.  defeated , 66–64 in the championship game, to win its 15th MEAC Tournament title.

The Aggies earned an automatic bid to the 1995 NCAA tournament as No. 16 seed in the Southeast region. In the round of 64, North Carolina A&T fell to No. 1 seed  Wake Forest 79–47.

Format
All nine conference members participated, with the top 7 teams receiving a bye to the quarterfinal round.

Bracket

* denotes overtime period

References

MEAC men's basketball tournament
1994–95 Mid-Eastern Athletic Conference men's basketball season
MEAC men's basketball tournament
Basketball competitions in Baltimore
College sports tournaments in Maryland